Acacia mimula is a tree in the genus Acacia. It is native to the Northern Territory, and found in open forest, from the Darwin region to western Arnhem Land.

Description
Acacia mimula is a tree which grows up  to 7 m high. Its bark is dark grey and has horizontal fissures. Its branchlets are flattened and smooth, and its stipules fall. The pulvinus is 3-4 mm long and minutely hairy. The phyllodes are elliptic, smooth, and curved, and are 70-180 mm long by 7-35 mm wide, with two to three primary veins. The secondary veins are oblique or penniveined or form a network. The base of the phyllode is attenuate, while the apex is obtuse. There are four to five glands along the dorsal margin. The axillary inflorescences are racemes or panicles, with 9-24 heads per raceme, on an axis 65-150 mm long. The white/cream heads are globular and  6-9 mm wide on smooth peduncles which are 6-14 mm long. The linear or oblong, slightly curved  pods are greyish and 75-130 mm long by 20-28 mm wide. The broadly ellipsoid, brown seeds are transverse in the pod and 10 mm long by 7-9 mm wide. It flowers from April to June and fruits from August to September.

It can be confused with A. latescens.

See also
 List of Acacia species

References

mimula
Taxa named by Leslie Pedley
Flora of the Northern Territory
Plants described in 1977